Georges Joseph Lumpp (18 September 1874 in La Guiche – 1 October 1934 in Collonges-au-Mont-d'Or) was a French rower who competed in the 1900 Summer Olympics. He was part of the French boat Club Nautique de Lyon, which won the silver medal in the coxed four with Charles Perrin, Daniel Soubeyran, Émile Wegelin .

References

External links

1874 births
1934 deaths
French male rowers
Olympic rowers of France
Rowers at the 1900 Summer Olympics
Olympic silver medalists for France
Olympic medalists in rowing
Medalists at the 1900 Summer Olympics
Sportspeople from Saône-et-Loire